Lucas Abelardo is a 1994 Philippine action film written and directed by Jose "Kaka" Balagtas. The film stars Roi Vinzon as the title role. It was one of the entries in the 1994 Metro Manila Film Festival, where it won six awards, including Best Actor and Best Story.

Cast
 Roi Vinzon as Lucas Abelardo
 Karen Timbol as Cenda
 Bembol Roco as Mayor
 Dante Rivero as Chief Lazaro
 Bob Soler as Governor
 Teresa Loyzaga as Lucas's Wife
 Karen Salas as Maria
 King Gutierrez as Colonel Banal
 Dencio Padilla as Inocencio
 Zandro Zamora as Baldo
 Conrad Poe as Hitman
 Roldan Aquino as Fiscal
 Levi Ignacio as Lucas' Policeman
 Dexter Doria as Governor's Wife
 Adonis Balagtas as Governor's Son
 Joniel Balagtas as Lucas' Son
 Danny Labra as Lucas' Policeman
 Polly Cadsawan as Lucas' Policeman
 Eddie Tuazon as Lucas' Policeman
 Vanni Ignacio as Lucas' Policeman
 Renato Del Prado as Chief's Henchman
 Bernard Atienza as Chief's Henchman
 Mon Fernandez as Chief's Henchman
 Naess Verano as Chief's Henchman
 Ray Ventura as Judge
 Tony Angeles as Lucas Lawyer
 Frank Young as Poldo
 Alex Toledo as Capt. Tiaga
 Jose "Kaka" Balagtas as State Witness

Awards

References

External links

1994 films
Filipino-language films
Philippine action films
Philippine political thriller films
Films about corruption
Films directed by Jose Balagtas